Chevrolet is a 1997 Spanish crime film directed by Javier Maqua. It was entered into the 20th Moscow International Film Festival where Isabel Ordaz won the Silver St. George for Best Actress.

Cast
 Javier Albalá as Brujos
 Manuel de Blas as Gaspar
 Isabel Ordaz as Lucía
 Mario Zorrilla as Juanvi
 Mariola Fuentes as Rosa
 Alfonso Asenjo as Turco
 Alfonso Vallejo as Cuevas
 Juan Margallo as Padre Miguel
 Emilio Batista as Pinto

References

External links
 

1997 films
1997 crime films
1990s Spanish-language films
Spanish crime films
1990s Spanish films